Sivasakthi is a 2008 Indian Tamil-language soap opera starring Shamitha, Renuka, Sabitha Anand, Viswanath, Shreekumar, Sanjeev, Saakshi Siva, and Poovilangu Mohan. It replaced Lakshmi and it was broadcast on Sun TV on Monday to Friday from 16 June 2008 to 18 December 2009 at 22:00 (IST) for 385 episodes. It was produced by Home Movie Makers Sujatha Vijakumar, director by Balaji Yadav. Shamitha, who plays the lead role, made her Tamil-language debut with the series. Co-actors Shreekumar and Shamitha were revealed to be married.

Plot
It is a story about single mother Sivagami and daughter Shakthi had been leading a happy life, though not doing well financially, life had been smooth for them both. Sivagami had a secret hidden behind her and daughter Sakthi does not know about it. Sakthi had always longed to have a big family like her best friend Parimala. One day Sivagami falls sick and that is when Sivasakthi learns the truth. Truth about her father, and her other four siblings. Sakthi promise her mother to find her siblings and bring them back to her. On her search, she experiences much difficulty. Lost her love life and yet carried on with her search for her siblings.

Cast

Main
 Shamitha as Shakthi
 A fourth daughter of Sivagami's, a poor girl, witnessed two murders. Grown up not knowing about her other siblings. Finally Sakthi learns of her siblings and promises her mother to find them. On the search of her siblings, she has lost her love, Venkat. Yet, for the love and desperate to meet her siblings, she continues with her life.
 Renuka / Sabitha Anand as Sivagami
 A mother of five kids. Has a lovely caring husband, brother-in-law and sister-in-law. She has five children. After her husband dies, she does odd jobs and finally ends up at an orphanage home.
 Shreekumar as Kannan (Left)
 A third son of Sivagami's, a rowdy and for Mukilan, Kannan is everything, because of his dedication. Kannan still remembers his mother and siblings, cries daily thinking about his mother and wondering where his siblings are. He does not know Sakthi is his sister, threatens her for a sim card after Sakti witnessed a murder and the person before dying gave her a sim card. Since then, both Sivagami and Sakthi consider Kannan to be a rowdy. Until Kannan sees Sivagami, he does not know Sakthi is his sister. Upon learning this, Kannan abandons his rowdy life and tells them he is Kannan, but they insult him. On the other hand. Mukilan is annoyed Kannan left him and decides to take revenge on Sakthi.
 Manjari Vinodhini/Sneha Nampiar as Kavitha/Gayathri the first daughter of Sivagami. She misses her mother and believes she has died. She wonders how to find her siblings. She married Saravanan and has a daughter, Divya.
 Vithiya as Vimala/Kanchana
 A fifth youngest daughter of Sivagami's, she is soft-spoken and fearful. She married Venkat without knowing about his love-life, Sakthi who happens to be her sister.
 Sailatha as Ponni
 A third daughter of Sivagami's, she is brave.

Supporting
 Viswanath as Venkat
 Shakthi's ex-boyfriend and Vimala's husband.
 Sharvan as Subramani (Shakti's husband)
 Sanjeev as Sevvazhai 
 Kannan as Saravanan Gayathri's husband
 Saakshi Siva as Sabapadhi
 Poovilangu Mohan 
 Vija Krishnaraj
 Swaminathan as Perumal
 Santhyananth as Nandhagopal
 Umamaheswari as Parimala
 She is a loving daughter, friendly, and Sakthi's best friend.
 Shanthy Anand as Rajeswari (Parimala's sister)
 Nesan as Akilan (Pooni's husband)
 Ashok as Ashok Kumar (Parimala's husband)
 Jekan as Bala Subramaniyum 
 Sandha as Shanthi

Casting
The series is a Mystery Family Thriller story. produced by  Home Media, that aired on Sun TV. Actress Shamitha landed in lead Female role, who has appeared in Tamil-language films like Pandavar Bhoomi, was selected to portray the lead role of Shakthi, making her Tamil-language debut with the series. Renuka was selected to portray Sivagami. Later Sabitha Anand was replaced role of Sivagami. Other main cast include Shreekumar, Sailatha, Vithiya, and Sneha Nampiar and the supporting cast include Viswanath, Sanjeev, Umamaheswari, Saakshi Siva and Poovilangu Mohan.

Original soundtrack

Title song
The title song was written by lyricist P. Vijay with vocals by Shankar Mahadevan and Shweta.

Soundtrack

Awards and nominations

International broadcast
The series was released on 16 June 2008 on Sun TV and the show was also broadcast internationally on Channel's international distribution. 
 It aired in Sri Lanka, South East Asia, Middle East, United States, Canada, Europe, Oceania, South Africa and Sub-Saharan Africa on Sun TV.
 It aired in the Indian state of Andhra Pradesh on Gemini TV, dubbed into Telugu Language.

See also
 List of programs broadcast by Sun TV

References

External links
 Official Website 
 Sun TV on YouTube
 Sun TV Network 
 Sun Group 

Sun TV original programming
Tamil-language thriller television series
2000s Tamil-language television series
2008 Tamil-language television series debuts
Tamil-language television shows
2009 Tamil-language television series endings